Danube 21 Euroregion is a Euroregion located in Romania, Bulgaria and Serbia. The administrative center is Craiova.

Gallery

Euroregions of Romania
Euroregions of Bulgaria
Euroregions of Serbia